Jean-René is a French masculine given name. Notable people with the name include:

 Jean René Allard (born 1930), a former politician in Manitoba, Canada
 Jean René Baroux (1922–1992), a veteran of the second world war and writer
 Jean René Bazaine (1904–2001), a French painter
 Jean-René Bernaudeau (born 1956), a French former professional road bicycle racer
 Jean René Constant Quoy (1790–1869), a French zoologist
 Jean-René Cruchet (1875–1959), a French pathologist
 Jean René Gauguin (1881–1961), a French/Danish sculptor
 Jean-René Jérôme (1942–1991), a Haitian painter and sculptor
 Jean-René Lecerf (born 1951), a French politician and a member of the Senate of France
 Jean-René Lisnard (born 1979), a professional tennis player from Monaco
 Jean-René Marsac (born 1954), a member of the National Assembly of France
 Jean René Akono (born 1967), Camaroonian volleyball player

Compound given names
French masculine given names